Kerek may refer to:
Kereks, an ethnic group of people in Russia
Kerek language
Angela Kerek, a German tennis player
Kerek, Markazi, a village in Markazi Province
Kerek, Tehran, a village in Tehran Province